The Wörld Is Ours – Vol. 2: Anyplace Crazy as Anywhere Else is the twelfth live album by the band Motörhead, released on 21 September 2012, the third UDR GmbH / Motörhead Music / EMI collaboration, and is the entire concert at the Wacken Open Air, Germany, with parts of the Sonisphere, England, and Rock in Rio, Brazil, concerts from 2011.

Recording
This was recorded on the 2011 leg of The Wörld is Ours tour. It is the entire concert at the Wacken Open Air Festival in Itzehoe, Schleswig-Holstein, Germany on 6 August, has parts of the Sonisphere Knebworth Festival, Knebworth, England on 10 July, and parts of the Rock in Rio, Rio de Janeiro, Brazil on 25 September 2011. Unlike the previous two live albums, there are no guest musicians appearing on the album. This completes The Wörld Is Ours tour recordings, which started in 2010 and made it around the world, including Australia.

Release
This is released in a single DVD and a 2 CD, both in 5.1 Surround and 2.0 Stereo formats, and had a special DVD and CD release, just like its predecessor. Like the vast majority of albums by Motörhead since the mid 2000s, the release didn't impact on the public at large but did well with its regular fan bases around the world.

If anything, it highlights the band's set by this stage in their career, as having progressed for so many years and nineteen albums later, it is at the point where time restraints are the problem. By now the band was playing a mixture of eighties songs – "Iron Fist" opening this half of the tour, "Over the Top" played for the first time in over twenty years, "The Chase Is Better Than The Catch" not seen until a revival in the recent years, "Just 'Cos You Got The Power" as well a long time missing from the live set, and "Killed by Death" which has barely missed a concert since being written in 1984; The track "Going to Brazil" continuing to be the sole song written in the nineties played live for some time; The very long-time staples of "Stay Clean", "Metropolis", "Ace of Spades" and "Overkill", having been played at every single concert, with very few exceptions, since being written. There is also a good mixture of newer songs, from their albums released after 2000, representing the now 15 years running lineup of Lemmy, Philip and Mikkey, the longest lineup the band has had, by more than double, when in its 35th year at the time of these recordings.

Track listing

Disc one

Disc two

DVD

Personnel
Per The Wörld Is Ours – Vol. 2: Anyplace Crazy as Anywhere Else liner notes.
 Lemmy Kilmister – lead vocals, bass
 Phil Campbell – lead guitar, backing vocals
 Mikkey Dee – drums
 Motörhead – executive producers

References

Motörhead live albums
2012 live albums